Sarajeh or Serajeh may refer to:
 Sarajeh, Qom
 Sarajeh, Razavi Khorasan